The Main Ustaša Headquarters was the ruling body of the Ustaša party in the Independent State of Croatia, convened under the poglavnik, Ante Pavelić.

Establishment 
The Ustaše emigrants lived in many different countries, but since 1929, the most important and most numerous group was group of Ustaše emigrants in Italy, led by Ante Pavelić. The Main Ustaša Headquarters evolved from Croatian Emigrant Office established by Pavelić in Milan, Italy and managed by Stanko Hranilović who also used alias Stanko Đurić and was one of the closest associates of Pavelić at that time. The group of Ustaše in Italy consisted of about 500 emigrants. The Main Ustaša Headquarters was first situated in Bovegno, Italy.

Organization 
The Main Ustaša Headquarters consisted of poglavnik, Doglavničko vijeće, Pobočnički zbor and commissioners. It is assumed that before the World War II only Mile Budak was appointed as doglavnik (in 1934) and Marko Došen as president of the Doglavničko vijeće.

The Council of the deputy chiefs of state (Doglavničko vijeće), a body of the Main Ustaša Headquarters, was made up of no more than twelve doglavniks (deputy leaders) at any one time and no more than 7 poglavni pobočniks (adjutants). In May 1941 Pavelić signed the law which defined Main Ustaša Headquarters as supreme body of Ustaše organization.

Doglavničko vijeće 
In March 1941, the members of Doglavničko vijeće were:
Andrija Betlehem
Mile Budak
Marko Došen
Slavko Kvaternik
Luka Lešić
Stjepan Matijević
Ademaga Mešić

Pobočnički zbor 
Besides doglavniks and their council, the Main Ustaša Headquarters had members who were adjutants (doglavni pobočnici) who constituted their own council (Pobočnički zbor) whose members were:
 Blaž Lorković
 Ivan Oršanić 
 Ivan Javor
 Mijo Bzik
 Alija Šuljak
 Mira Vrličak-Dugački
 Vjekoslav Blaškov
 Hakija Hadžić

Commissioners 
Besides Poglavnik, his deputies and adjutants, the leadership of the Ustaše organization had also commissioners who were appointed by poglavnik. It is important to differentiate commissioners of the Main Ustaša Headquarters from commissioners temporarily appointed as temporary authorities to establish Croatian control of certain regions.

The commissioners of the Main Ustaša Headquarters included:
 Zdenko Blažeković, a commissioner for physical education and sport
 Božo Cerovski, a commissioner for internal affairs and security
 Eugen Dido Kvaternik
 Vjekoslav Luburić
 Vilko Pećnikar
 Branko Rukavina
 Frane Miletić
 Ante Štitić
 Vlado Singer
 Vlado Herceg
 Vlado Jonić
 Franjo Laslo
 Aleksandar Seitz
 Danijel Crljen, a commissioner for education and propaganda
 Šime Cvitanović
 Mira Vrličak Dugački
 Dragan Dujmović
 Tomiša Grgić
 Marijan Šimić
 Nikola Jurišić
 Mato Jagodić
 Ivan Pregrad

References

Sources 
 
 
 
 
 
 
 
 
 
 
 
 
 

Ustaše
Independent State of Croatia
1941 establishments in Croatia
March 1941 events